Der Urologe is a peer-reviewed scientific journal of urology published by Springer Medizin. It was established in 1962. The current editor-in-chief is Bernd Wullich.

In 1970, the journal split into Der Urologe. Ausg. A and Der Urologe. Ausg. B (which continued the short-lived Der Urologische Facharzt, published from 1968 to 1969). Der Urologe. Ausg. B ceased publications in 2002, upon which Der Urologe. Ausg. A was renamed Der Urologe.

External links

German-language journals
Publications established in 1962
Urology journals
Springer Science+Business Media academic journals
Monthly journals